Guardian Angel is a Canadian drama film, directed by Jean-Sébastien Lord and released in 2014.

The film stars Guy Nadon as Normand, a man who works as a night security guard in an office building. One night he catches Nathalie (Marilyn Castonguay) and Guylain (Patrick Hivon) attempting a robbery; he chases them off, but is surprised when Nathalie returns a few weeks later to request his help because her relationship with Guylain is abusive. Meanwhile, he is attempting to salvage his troubled relationship with his wife Monique (Véronique Le Flaguais). The film was shot in Montreal, primarily in the Mile End.

The film premiered at the Rendez-vous du cinéma québécois in February 2014.

The film received two Prix Jutra nominations at the 17th Jutra Awards, for Best Actor (Nadon) and Best Supporting Actor (Hivon).

References

External links

2014 films
Canadian drama films
Quebec films
Films shot in Montreal
French-language Canadian films
2010s Canadian films